Carnival Splendor is a  operated by Carnival Cruise Line. As she is the only Concordia-class ship in the Carnival fleet, she is also referred to as a Splendor-class ship. Her other sister ships are part of the Costa Crociere fleet. The ship was originally designed and ordered for Costa Cruises but she was transferred to Carnival Cruise Line during construction.

The  ship entered service on 2 July 2008 as the largest Carnival ship until  debuted in September 2009.

Christening 

Carnival Splendors godmother is Myleene Klass, who on 10 July 2008 christened the vessel in Dover in a ceremony where she played Sailing on the piano, while a Royal Navy diver climbed up five decks on a rope, and broke the bottle of champagne on the bow by hand.

Areas of operation

Carnival Splendors inaugural season began on 2 July 2008 with a cruise from Genoa, Italy to Dover, England, followed by cruises to Northern European ports. On 3 November 2008 she transited to Fort Lauderdale, Florida.

In January 2009, Carnival Splendor moved to Long Beach, California, a journey which took 49 days. The ship's post-Panamax size made it too wide to navigate the Panama Canal at the time, so it made the journey by sailing around Cape Horn. It was the first Carnival ship to have ever made this voyage. From Long Beach, she sailed year-round cruises to Mexico.

In March 2009, Carnival Splendor was the host ship for Mayercraft Carrier 2, a four-day cruise from 27 to 31 March, from Los Angeles to Cabo San Lucas, Mexico hosted by musician John Mayer and featuring music and comedy shows.

In February 2013, Carnival Splendor sailed again around South America, re-positioning to New York City to cruise to the Caribbean and Bermuda. In November 2014, Carnival Splendor was re-positioned to Florida to offer seasonal seven-day cruises to the Eastern and Western Caribbean.
In March 2014, Carnival announced Carnival Splendor would sail seasonally out of Norfolk, Virginia before heading back to New York beginning in 2015.

In October 2015, Carnival announced that Carnival Splendor would be re-positioned to China in 2018 offering year-round short cruises. However, Carnival subsequently announced in November 2016 that Carnival Splendor would instead relocate to Long Beach for the second time in January 2018, offering cruises to the Mexican Riviera. To move to Long Beach from the Caribbean, she sailed through the Panama Canal and became one of the largest ships to cross through the new locks.

In February 2018, Carnival announced Carnival Splendor would sail to Australia in December 2019 to operate year-round out of Sydney.

On 5 October 2019, the ship embarked on a 24-day transpacific cruise to Singapore, where she was dry docked to undergo renovations before being homeported in Sydney. Stops along the voyage included Maui, Oahu, Guam, Kota Kinabalu, and Ho Chi Minh City. This was the longest voyage ever offered by Carnival, and was Carnival Splendors final voyage out of Long Beach.

From 30 October to 24 November 2019, Carnival Splendor underwent renovations prior to sailing to her homeport in Sydney.

In February 2022, Carnival announced that due to uncertain times in the Australian cruise industry, Splendor would have her Australia based cruises canceled through September 2022, with the ship expected to return to the US and a new homeport will be announced in the coming weeks. It was announced that Splendor will sail from Seattle, Washington, taking over Carnival Freedom, alongside Carnival Spirit.

In March 2022, it was announced by Carnival's Brand Ambassador John Heald that the vessel would take a 23-day cruise from Seattle to its homeport in Sydney on September 6, 2022.

On May 2, 2022, Carnival Splendor became the final ship of the brand to return to service, marking Carnival's full return to service.

Incidents and accidents

2010 fire

On 8 November 2010, at approximately 06:00 Pacific Time, on the second day of a voyage from Long Beach to the Mexican Riviera, the ship experienced a catastrophic failure of the No. 5 diesel generator which started a fire in her aft engine room. The fire spread to the overhead electrical cable runs in the aft engine room. The fire in the cable runs caused extensive damage to the cabling and contributed to the ship losing all electrical power. According to Carnival president, Gerry Cahill, a "crankcase split, and that's what caused the fire", adding it was isolated to the aft generator room. The fire was extinguished by the afternoon, and no one was injured. Nearly 4,500 passengers and crew members were on board at the time.

The crew was unable to restore power to the engines, and the ship was towed by tugboat to San Diego. Without power for air conditioning and refrigeration, passengers were fed rations delivered via U.S. Navy helicopters from the aircraft carrier . Splendor was escorted by, and received aid and security assistance from the U.S. Coast Guard Cutter .  Carnival Splendor arrived in San Diego under tow around sunrise on 11 November, and docked around noon. Carnival promised to refund all passengers for ticket and travel expenses along with a voucher for a free cruise of equal value to their cruise on Carnival Splendor.

The ship has three 12-cylinder Wärtsilä 12V46C medium-speed diesel generating sets in the aft engine room and three in a forward engine room. Each generator is connected to two switchboards. The failure of a single engine or generator should not normally cause a total power loss. Clark Dodge, former chief engineer for Washington State Ferries, said, "If things were designed properly, all the power shouldn't have gone out."

The investigation into the fire was carried out by the United States Coast Guard in conjunction with the Panamanian Maritime Authority. The report into the cause of the fire was released on 15 July 2013.

2012 armed robbery
On 23 February 2012, while in Puerto Vallarta port, Mexico, 22 passengers on the Carnival-organized "City and Jungle Tour" were robbed by an armed bandit. Passengers lost money, cameras, purses, passports, other documents and valuables. No shots were fired and everybody escaped without injuries.

2017 engine troubles
Carnival canceled the remaining portion of the cruise and returned to Miami. Carnival offered a 50% refund off the cost of the cruise, free internet use for the remainder of the voyage, and a 50% discount off a future cruise.

References

External links 

 

 

2007 ships
Maritime incidents in 2010
Maritime incidents in 2012
Ship fires
Ships built by Fincantieri
Ships built in Genoa
Splendor